Onyx Cave may refer to several things in the United States:

Onyx Cave (Arizona), a National Natural Landmark
Onyx Cave (Arkansas), a small show cave
Onyx Cave (Kentucky), a show cave
Great Onyx Cave, Kentucky
Great Onyx Cave Entrance, Mammoth Cave, Kentucky, listed on the NRHP in Kentucky
Crystal Onyx Cave, Kentucky
Onyx Cave (Newburg, Missouri), listed on the NRHP in Missouri
Onyx Mountain Caverns, Missouri

See also 
 Cave onyx